Rochester may refer to:

Steamships 

 , a passenger-cargo paddle steamer built by Caird & Company for Royal Mail Lines as Atrato
 Rochester (1880), a cargo ship built by Union Dry Dock Company, and lost by fire in 1912 as Sydney C. Mclouth
 Rochester (1898), a British fishing trawler built by Mackie & Thomson, Govan, requisitioned in World War I, and sunk by a German mine on 27 July 1944 
 Rochester (1907), a cargo ship built by the Great Lakes Engineering Works for service on the Great Lakes
 Rochester (1910), a passenger ship built by the Detroit Shipbuilding Company for service on the Great Lakes
 Rochester (1912), a cargo ship built by the Great Lakes Engineering Works as Yaguez, and sunk on 2 November 1917 by a submarine torpedo
 Rochester (1920), an oil tanker built by the Bethlehem Shipbuilding Corporation at Sparrows Point, Maryland and sunk on 30 January 1942 by a submarine torpedo

Naval ships 
 , a number of ships of the United Kingdom's Royal Navy
 , a number of ships of the United States Navy

References